Shendurney Wildlife Sanctuary is a protected area in the Western Ghats, India, located in Kollam district of Kerala and comes under the control of Agasthyamalai Biosphere Reserve. It was established on 25 August 1984 and comprises . The name is a corruption of the Chengurinji, a tree endemic to the region (Gluta travancorica). The sanctuary has an artificial lake of nearly 18.69Sq.km size and also surrounded by the reservoir of Thenmala Dam. The Shendurney Wildlife Sanctuary is a treasure house of plant diversity. About 1257 species of flowering plants belonging to more than 150 families are reported from this sanctuary of which 309 species are endemic to Western Ghats. Birds from 267 species including migratory, endemic and endangered species have been reported here.

Tropical evergreen and semi-evergreen forest cover a major area of the sanctuary. It has a presence of lion-tailed macaque, a highly endangered species. A brood of the highly elusive nocturnal forest bird, the Great Eared Nightjar was spotted for the first time at Shendurney Wildlife Sanctuary in Kollam, Kerala. Earlier, it was recorded from the Siruvani foothills in Tamil Nadu in May 1995. The Great Eared Nightjar (Eurostopodus macrotis bourdilloni) belongs to the nightjar family. It gets its name from the two erect earlike tufts of feathers on its head, behind the eyes).

The first eco-tourism project in India, Thenmala Eco-tourism Project has been formulated 
in and around Shenduruney Wildlife Sanctuary.

Another important aspect of the Shendurnani Sanctuary is that there is no sandalwood trees here.

References

South Western Ghats montane rain forests
Wildlife sanctuaries of the Western Ghats
Wildlife sanctuaries in Kerala
1984 establishments in Kerala
Geography of Kollam district
Protected areas of Kerala
Tourist attractions in Kollam district
Protected areas established in 1984